Robin Thomas (August 22, 1962 – March 26, 2020) was a mathematician working in graph theory at the Georgia Institute of Technology.

Thomas received his doctorate in 1985 from Charles University in Prague, Czechoslovakia (now the Czech Republic), under the supervision of Jaroslav Nešetřil. He joined the faculty at Georgia Tech in 1989, and became a Regents' Professor there,
briefly serving as the department Chair.

On March 26, 2020, he died of Amyotrophic Lateral Sclerosis at the age of 57 after 12 years of struggle with the illness.

Awards 
Thomas was awarded the Fulkerson Prize for outstanding papers in discrete mathematics twice, in 1994 as co-author of a paper on the Hadwiger conjecture, and in 2009 for the proof of the strong perfect graph theorem.
In 2011 he was awarded the Karel Janeček Foundation Neuron Prize for Lifetime Achievement in Mathematics. In 2012 he became a fellow of the American Mathematical Society.
He was named a SIAM Fellow in 2018.

References

External links 
 Personal homepage of Robin Thomas
 

1962 births
2020 deaths
Charles University alumni
Georgia Tech faculty
20th-century Czech mathematicians
21st-century American mathematicians
Deaths from motor neuron disease
Fellows of the American Mathematical Society
Fellows of the Society for Industrial and Applied Mathematics
Graph theorists
Czechoslovak emigrants to the United States
Czechoslovak mathematicians